Anand Mohan Singh (born 28 January 1954) is a convicted killer, politician and was founder of the now-defunct Bihar People's Party (BPP). , he is serving a life sentence for abetting murder; prior to reduction to this term on appeal, he had been the first politician in independent India to be given the death penalty. He comes from the village of Panchgachiya in Saharsa district, Bihar.

Early life 
Anand Mohan Singh Tomar comes from Pachgachhia village in Saharsa district, Bihar. He belongs to Tomar Rajput Family. He is the grandson of Ram Bahadur Singh Tomar, an Indian freedom fighter. His introduction to politics came through involvement with the Sampoorna Kranti movement of Jayaprakash Narayan, which caused him to drop out of college in 1974.

Imprisonment 
Singh has had numerous charges filed against him at various times, many of which were either dropped or resulted in acquittal. He and six other people, including his wife Lovely Anand, were accused in relation to the 1994 murder of a Dalit District Magistrate (DM) from Gopalganj, G. Krishnaiah, who was lynched on a major highway near to Muzaffarpur during a funeral cortege for the BPP member and gangster, Chhotan Shukla. In 2007, the Patna High Court sentenced him to death for abetting the crime. The sentence was reduced to rigorous life imprisonment in 2008, when the six other accused were also acquitted due to lack of evidence. The reduction was because there was no evidence that Singh was the actual assailant. In 2012 Singh failed in his appeal to the Supreme Court of India against the reduced sentence. The same Supreme Court hearing dismissed an appeal from the Government of Bihar for reinstatement of the death penalty and for an overturning of the acquittal of the six other people.

At the time of the original sentence in 2007, Singh was the first Indian politician since independence to have been given a death penalty. Soon after that sentence, upon being transferred from Patna's Beur jail to that of Bhagalpur, Singh went on hunger strike in protest of the facilities and being split from Akhlaq Ahmed and Arun Kumar, who had received death penalties in the same case. The jail authorities were unsympathetic, noting that rules dictated those sentenced to death should sleep on the floor and be allowed only simple food.

Influence 
Despite being in prison, Singh aided his wife, Lovely Anand, whom he had married in 1991, in standing as an INC candidate in the 2010 Bihar Assembly elections and as a Samajwadi Party candidate in the 2014 general elections. The Supreme Court had barred convicted criminals from standing in elections but he still has much influence. She has claimed that her husband is the victim of a political conspiracy.

People from his home village of Panchgachiya consider him to be a Robin Hood figure. Tehelka said in 2007 that

Writings 
He has written two anthologies of poems while imprisoned, Quaid mei Azad Kalam (Pen is free behind bars, 2011) and Swadheen Abhivyakti (2014). Gandhi kektas ke phool (2020)

See also 
Caste politics in India
Anant Kumar Singh
Pradeep Mahto
Ashok Mahto gang
Jagdish Mahto

References 
Notes

Citations

Living people
People from Saharsa district
India MPs 1996–1997
India MPs 1998–1999
Lok Sabha members from Bihar
Janata Dal politicians
Indian politicians convicted of crimes
Gang members
Crime in Bihar
Janata Dal (United) politicians
Indian National Congress politicians
Criminals from Bihar
Bihar MLAs 1990–1995
Samata Party politicians
Bihar People's Party politicians
Rashtriya Janata Party politicians
1956 births